Mount Tasman (Horokoau in Māori) is New Zealand's second highest mountain, rising to a height of . It is located in the Southern Alps of the South Island, four kilometres to the north of its larger neighbour, Aoraki / Mount Cook. Unlike Aoraki / Mount Cook, Mount Tasman sits on the South Island's Main Divide, on the border between Aoraki / Mount Cook National Park and Westland Tai Poutini National Park. It is the highest point in Westland District.

The first ascent of Mount Tasman was in 1895 by Edward FitzGerald and his guide Matthias Zurbriggen.

The Māori name (horo: to swallow; koau: shag or Phalacrocorax varius) is believed to refer to the swelling in the neck of a shag when it is swallowing a fish.

Aoraki / Mount Cook National Park

Mount Tasman is located in Aoraki / Mount Cook National Park in the Canterbury region, which was established in 1953 and along with Westland Tai Poutini National Park, Mount Aspiring National Park and Fiordland National Park forms one of the UNESCO World Heritage Sites.

Gallery

See also
 List of mountains of New Zealand by height

References

Southern Alps
Westland District
Mountains of Canterbury, New Zealand
Mountains of the West Coast, New Zealand